Jimmy McCoy Tamandi (born 12 May 1980) is a Swedish former professional footballer who played as a defender. He represented Malmö FF, AIK, Potenza, Lyn and GAIS during a career that spanned between 1999 and 2013. He won one cap for the Sweden national team in 2001.

Club career 
He started his career at Nydala IF before moving to Malmö FF in 1992. He made his professional debut in 1999 when Malmö were relegated. He stayed with the team through promotion in 2000 and then also in the 2001 comeback campaign. In 2002, he switched to AIK where he has had mixed successes. In 2004, he was part of the team that were relegated. Tamandi had at this point already signed for Italian side Salernitana to where he moved in January 2005.

However, Salernitana had changed their management with the management that had signed Tamandi now gone. He was therefore forced out of the club and made play for Serie C side Potenza. In the summer of 2005 Tamandi returned to AIK and was a major part in the club's successful campaign for promotion back to the Allsvenskan. In 2007 he went for free to the Norwegian club Lyn. There he spent two years before the club went bankrupt. He then signed for GAIS and played there for three seasons and finished his professional football career.

International career 
Having represented the Sweden U17, U19, and U21 teams, Tamandi made his full international debut for the Sweden national team on 31 January 2001 in a friendly 0–0 draw with the Faroe Islands.

References

External links
Swedish national team stats
Swedish U-21 national team stats

1980 births
Living people
Swedish footballers
Swedish expatriate footballers
Sweden international footballers
Sweden under-21 international footballers
U.S. Salernitana 1919 players
GAIS players
Malmö FF players
AIK Fotboll players
Lyn Fotball players
Allsvenskan players
Superettan players
Eliteserien players
Expatriate footballers in Norway
Expatriate footballers in Italy
Swedish people of Jamaican descent
Sportspeople of Jamaican descent
Association football defenders
Footballers from Malmö